Malhar Rao Gaekwad was the eleventh Maharaja of Baroda State reigning from 1870 to 1875. He was the sixth son of Sayaji Rao Gaekwad II and became Maharaja of Baroda after the death of his elder brother, Malhar Rao Gaekwad.

Reign
Malhar Rao spent money liberally on prostitutes, nearly emptying the Baroda coffers (he commissioned a pair of solid gold cannon and a carpet of pearls, among other expenses) and soon reports reached the Resident of Malhar Rao's gross tyranny and cruelty. Malharrao further attempted to cover up his deeds by poisoning the British Resident at Baroda, Robert Phayre, brother of Lieutenant General Arthur Purves Phayre with a compound of arsenic. By order of the Secretary of State for India, Lord Salisbury, Malharrao was deposed on 10 April 1875 and exiled to Madras, where he died in obscurity in 1882.

References

External links
BARODA
Trial of Malharrao 1875

1831 births
1882 deaths
Maharajas of Vadodara